Megorashim ( "expelled") is a term used to refer to Jews from the Iberian Peninsula who arrived in North Africa as a result of the anti-Jewish persecutions of 1391 and the expulsion of Jews from Spain in 1492. These migrants were distinct from pre-existing North African Jews called Toshavim. The Toshavim had been present in North Africa since ancient times, spoke the local languages (Arabic or Berber), and had traditions that were influenced by Maghrebi Islam. The Megorashim influenced North African Judaism, incorporating traditions from Spain. They eventually merged with the Toshavim, so that it is now difficult to distinguish between the two groups. The Jews of North Africa are often referred to as Sephardi, a term that emphasizes their Iberian traditions.

Migrations 
The first migration took place following the persecutions of 1391 in Catalonia, Valencia and the Balearic Islands. Many Megorashim took refuge along the North African coast, especially in Algeria. Among them were prestigious rabbis like Isaac ben Sheshet and Simeon ben Zemah Duran. Of the 40,000 to 70,000 Jews who left Spain in 1492 following the Alhambra decree, the Jewish Encyclopedia estimates that 32,000 reached the coast of North Africa; (20,000 in Morocco, 10,000 in Algeria). Others say, however, that it is impossible to really estimate how many Iberian Jews found refuge in Morocco and the Maghreb.

Communities 
These Jews had their own leaders, rabbis and spiritual leaders as well as their own minhag. They spoke the different languages of the Iberian Peninsula from which they originated (Castilian, Aragonese, Catalan, Galician, etc.) and a standardized Judeo-Spanish form, called Judezmo, has long been used by the diaspora.

After 1391, the Megorashim had settled mainly in Algeria (Algiers and its adjacent cities, Tlemcen, Oran, Ténès, Béjaïa, Constantine), Tunisia (Tunis), and Morocco (Meknes, Fez, and Debdou, with the capture of Seville). Following the expulsion edict of 1492, new waves of Megorashim came to North Africa, specifically Tetouan, Fez, Meknes, Rabat, Sale, and Marrakesh. They then moved to Mogador when the Alaouite King Mohammed bin Abdullah invited the Jews to settle there and take care of relations with Portugal.

In most of the communities where they settled, the Megorashim imposed their rabbis and their reforms, eventually merging with local Jews (the Toshavim). They were at the origin of the revival of Maghreb Judaism strongly weakened by Almohade persecution. The arrival of Rabbi Ephraim Alnaqua of Seville at the end of 1391 in Tlemcen allowed Jews settled in the neighboring towns of Honaine and Agadir to settle in the city itself. In Tetouan, where they formed the main Jewish component of the city, the Megorashim imposed their Judeo-Spanish language known as Haketia. In Algiers in the 15th century, the Jews were classified in several categories: those native to Africa, those coming from the Balearic Islands and Spain or from France, by Constantinople and Italy.

In the 16th Century, Spanish attacks on the shores of Algeria and North Africa often pushed the Jews to abandon the coast for the interior of the land. This provoked several times the expulsion of Jews from the city of Oran and the destruction of Béjaïa and Algiers. The defeat of the Spanish on the taking of the city was famous by the Jewish community during the Purim of Algiers. With the Spanish protectorate in northern Morocco from the 19th Century, we are witnessing the first reconciliation between Sephardis and Spaniards, and many Jews from Tetuan settled in Gibraltar, Spain, and Latin America at the same time.

In Mogador and along the Atlantic coast, Jews are generally heavily involved in trade between Morocco and Portugal. Within the regency of Algiers and Tunis the trade with Europe and the rest of the Ottoman Empire was often the fact of the Megorashim, especially the Grana of Livorno who had settled there since the 16th Century.

Megorashim relations with, and influence over, the Toshavim varies widely among the communities in which they settled. This European influence on the local way of life tended to ignore the population living on the edge of urban centers, or even provoked a hostile reaction.

See also 
Lançados
Sephardic Bnei Anusim
North African Sephardim

Groups 

 Granas
 Marrano
 Toshavim
 Haketia

Communities 

 History of the Jews in Morocco
 History of the Jews in Algeria
 History of the Jews in Tunisia

References 

Jewish diaspora
Medieval Spain
Jewish Spanish history
Ethnic groups in Morocco
Jewish Moroccan history
Jewish Algerian history
Portuguese diaspora in Africa
Spanish diaspora in Africa
Sephardi Jewish culture in North Africa
Hebrew words and phrases